Sophia Ahrens is a German-English fashion model.

Early life 
Ahrens was born in Hamburg to a German father and English mother and grew up mainly in England. She was scouted at age 12 by Laura Murphy (The Hive Management) in January 2015) while Christmas shopping in a London mall.

Career

As of 2015, Ahrens is currently signed to DNA Model Management. Ahrens is one of the faces of Paco Rabanne. She has modeled for Giorgio Armani, Prada and Claudie Pierlot. In 2014, she was the face of the perfume “Daisy“ by Marc Jacobs.

In the 2015 F/W season, she ranked 8 on the list of top models, according to MADAME, a German fashion magazine

In August 2018, Ahrens was on the cover of Elle Italia, as well as doing various editorials.

References

Living people
German emigrants to the United Kingdom
English female models
People from Hamburg
1996 births
English people of German descent